The Hershey Impact was an indoor soccer club based in Hershey, Pennsylvania that competed in the National Professional Soccer League.

The team played its home games at the Hersheypark Arena for all of its 3 seasons.

Staff and ownership
 President – Larry Samples
 General Manager – Charles (Chuck) Wasilefski
 Public Relations Director – Todd Parnell
 Equipment Manager- Michael Butula

Coaches
 Niki Nikolic

Year-by-year

References

Soccer clubs in Pennsylvania
Defunct indoor soccer clubs in the United States
American Indoor Soccer Association teams
National Professional Soccer League (1984–2001) teams